Eupithecia procerissima is a moth in the family Geometridae. It is found in Chile (Santiago Province).

The length of the forewings is about 11.5 mm. The ground colour of the forewings is white with some greyish brown basal spots. The ground colour of the hindwings is white with greyish white transverse lines. Adults are on wing in October.

Etymology
The specific name is derived from procerissimus (meaning more robust or larger).

References

Moths described in 1994
procerissima
Moths of South America
Endemic fauna of Chile